Heihe Aihui Airport  is the airport serving the city of Heihe in Heilongjiang Province, China. It is not far away from Ignatyevo Airport in Blagoveshchensk, Russia.

History
In March 2016, China Daily reported that the airport had changed its name from simply Heihe Airport to Heihe Aihui Airport, reflecting the district in which the city of Heihe is located.

Airlines and destinations

References

Airports in Heilongjiang